Lepista personata (also recognised as Lepista saeva, Clitocybe saeva and Tricholoma personatum, and commonly known as the field blewit and blue-leg) is a species of edible fungus commonly found growing in grassy areas across Europe and is morphologically related to the wood blewit (Lepista nuda).

Taxonomy 
This species was originally proclaimed by Elias Fries in 1818, as Agaricus personatus. Cooke proposed in 1871 another name still in use today — Lepista personata. Other names were to follow, namely Lepista saeva by P.D. Orton in 1960 and Clitocybe saeva by H.E. Bigelow & A.H. Smith in 1969, the latter placing the fungus in the larger genus Clitocybe. In Latin, the specific epithet sævus is an adjective meaning either fierce, outrageous, angry or strong. Likewise, personatus is a participle meaning disguised, pretended or false.

Description 
The fruiting body of the mushroom resembles an agaric. The cap is at first hemispherical or convex, becoming almost flat with maturity, up to 16 cm in diameter. The cap cuticle is colored cream to light brown with a smooth texture to the touch, and is often seen glistening when fresh. Along the periphery, the cap ends in a thick incurved margin which may unfold as the mushroom expands. The white to pallid flesh is thick, firm and delicate upon slicing. The underside of the cap bears crowded pinkish, cream to light brown gills, which are free or emarginate in relation to the stem. The stem itself is cylindrical with a bulbous, or sometimes tapering base, and does not bear a ring. The stem is covered by a striking lavender or lilac-coloured fibrous skin which fades in older individuals, and has a thick, firm flesh concolorous with that of the cap. It is up to 6–7 cm tall and 2.5–3 cm in diameter.

Under a light microscope, the spores are seen hyaline to pink, ellipsoid in shape, and with fine warts. The spore dimensions are 6-8 by 4-5 µm. L. personata produces a pale pink spore print.

Distribution and habitat 
Lepista personata is found fruiting in open grasslands, parks, pastures, forest clearings, and in the vicinity of forest edges, unlike Lepista nuda which is commonly found in woodland. Lepista personata fruits gregariously, forming distinctive fairy rings. Its fruiting season extends from summer to the beginning of winter, and is widespread in Europe. In the UK, the season extends from September through to December. It has also been allegedly reported from California in North America.

Edibility 

Field blewits are generally regarded as edible, but they are known to cause allergic reactions in sensitive individuals. This is particularly likely if the mushroom is consumed raw, though allergic reactions are known even from cooked blewits.

Field blewits should therefore be cooked before eating, as the consumption of raw specimens could lead to indigestion. Blewits can be eaten as a cream sauce or sautéed in butter; they can also be cooked like tripe or as an omelette filling.

Field blewits are often infested with fly larvae and don't store very well; they should therefore be used soon after picking. They are also very porous, so they are best picked on a dry day.

References

External links 
 
 "Mushroom-Collecting.com - The Blewit"
 All that Rain Promises and More - Blewit

Edible fungi
personata
Tricholomataceae
Fungi of Europe
Fungi found in fairy rings
Taxa named by Elias Magnus Fries